Burnyeat is a surname. Notable people with the surname include:

John Burnyeat ( 1631–1690), English Quaker
Myles Burnyeat (1939–2019), English historian of philosophy
William Burnyeat (1874–1916), British politician